INEX Legends Road Course World Finals is an annual automobile race for Legends cars.

Drivers are divided into four divisions; Pro, Semi-Pro, Masters and Young Lions. This INEX event brings in a diverse group of drivers from across the world. Countries that have participated in these events have come from countries like South Africa, Italy, Finland, Australia and the UK.

Champions

References 

Auto races in the United States